Bitter lemon is a bitter lemon flavoured  soft drink. Its signature  taste is a result of inherently bitter lemon pith being reinforced by the bitter alkaloid quinine. 

The principal difference between tonic water and bitter lemon is the lemon juice, pith, and peel. The juice adds sour, offset by additional sweetener, and the oily peel fragrance. 

Bitter lemon is consumed both by itself and as a mixer, and is sold around the world.

The generic bitter lemon drink dates back to 1834.  Schweppes introduced its brand of bitter lemon in 1957.

In South Africa the beverage is branded as Dry Lemon.

Brands

Australia
• Schweppes

Britain
Schweppes
Fever-Tree

Canada
Canada Dry
The Great Jamaican

Cameroon
Bubble Up

France
Gini

Israel
Schweppes

Kenya
Krest

Netherlands
Royal Club

Nigeria
Teem
Limca

Somalia
 StrangeLove

United States
Polar Beverages
Fever-Tree

See also

 List of lemon dishes and beverages

References

Lemon sodas
Quinine
1834 establishments
Drink mixers